Roger Manners, 5th Earl of Rutland (1576–1612) 

Roger Manners may also refer to:

Roger Manners (died 1607) (1536–1607), MP
Roger Manners (died 1632) (1575–1632), MP
Roger Manners, a character in the 1950 film State Penitentiary